Thomas Skipwith  may refer to:
Skipwith baronets of Prestwould
Sir Thomas George Skipwith, 9th Baronet (1803–1863)
Skipwith baronets of Newbold Hall
Sir Thomas Skipwith, 4th Baronet (c. 1735-1790)
Skipwith baronets of Metheringham
Sir Thomas Skipwith, 1st Baronet (c. 1620-1694)
Sir Thomas Skipwith, 2nd Baronet (c. 1652-1710)

See also
Skipwith (disambiguation)